Ulmus parvifolia, commonly known as the Chinese elm or lacebark elm, is a species native to eastern Asia, including China, India, Japan, Korea, and Vietnam. It has been described as "one of the most splendid elms, having the poise of a graceful Nothofagus".

The tree was introduced to the UK in 1794 by James Main, who collected in China for Gilbert Slater of Low Layton, Essex.

Description
The leathery, lustrous green, single-toothed leaves are small, 2–5 cm long by 1–3 cm broad, and often retained as late as December or even January in Europe and North America. The apetalous wind-pollinated perfect flowers are produced in early autumn, small and inconspicuous. The fruit is a samara, elliptical to ovate-elliptical, 10–13 mm long by 6–8 mm broad. The samara is mostly glabrous, the seed at the centre or toward the apex, is borne on a stalk 1–3 mm in length; it matures rapidly and disperses by late autumn. The trunk has a handsome, flaking bark of mottled greys with tans and reds, giving rise to its other common name, the lacebark elm, although scarring from major branch loss can lead to large, canker-like wounds. Ploidy: 2n = 28.

Many nurserymen and foresters mistakenly refer to Ulmus pumila, the rapidly growing, disease-ridden, relatively short-lived, weak-wooded Siberian elm, as "Chinese elm". This has given the true Chinese elm an undeserved bad reputation. The two elms are very distinct and different species. The Siberian elm's bark becomes deeply ridged and furrowed with age, among other obvious differences. It possesses a very rough, greyish-black appearance, while the Chinese elm's smooth bark becomes flaky and blotchy, exposing very distinctive, light-coloured mottling, hence the synonym lacebark elm for the real Chinese elm.

Wood and timber
Elms, hickory, and ash all have remarkably hard, tough wood, making them popular for tool handles, bows, and baseball bats. Chinese elm is considered the hardest of the elms. Chinese elm is said to be the best of all woods for chisel handles and similar uses due to its superior hardness, toughness, and resistance to splitting. Chinese elm lumber is used most for furniture, cabinets, veneer, hardwood flooring, and specialty uses such as longbow construction and tool handles. Most commercially milled lumber goes directly to manufacturers rather than to retail lumber outlets.

Chinese elm heartwood ranges in tone from reddish-brown to light tan, while the sapwood approaches off-white. The grain is often handsome and dramatic. Unlike other elms, the freshly cut Chinese elm has a peppery or spicy odour. While it turns easily and will take a nice polish off the lathe without any finish, and it holds detail well, the fibrous wood is usually considered too tough for carving or hand tools. Chinese elm contains silica which is hard on planer knives and chainsaws, but it sands fairly easily. Like other woods with interlocking grain, planes should be kept extra sharp to prevent tearing at the grain margins. It steam-bends easily and holds screws well, but pilot holes and countersinking are needed. It tends to be a "lively" wood, tending to warp and distort while drying. This water-resistant wood easily takes most finishes and stains.

Taxonomy
Subspecies, varieties, and forms:
Ulmus parvifolia var. coreana Nakai
Ulmus parvifolia f. lanceolata Ueki

Pests and diseases
The Chinese elm is highly resistant, but not immune, to Dutch elm disease. It is also very resistant to the elm leaf beetle Xanthogaleruca luteola, but has a moderate susceptibility to elm yellows. In trials at the Sunshine Nursery, Oklahoma, the species was adjudged as having the best pest resistance of about 200 taxa  However, foliage was regarded as only "somewhat resistant" to black spot by the Plant Diagnostic Clinic of the University of Missouri.

Cottony cushion scale or mealy bugs, often protected and "herded" by ants, exude sticky, sweet honeydew, which can mildew leaves and be a minor annoyance by dripping on cars and furniture. However, severe infestations on or obvious damage to otherwise healthy trees are uncommon.

In some regions of the Southern United States, a fungus known as Phymatotrichopsis omnivora is known to cause sudden death of lacebark elms when infected.

Cultivation
The Chinese elm is a tough landscape tree, hardy enough for use in harsh planting situations such as parking lots, small planters along streets, and plazas or patios. The tree is arguably the most ubiquitous elm, now found on all continents except Antarctica. It was introduced to Europe at the end of the 18th century as an ornamental and is found in many botanical gardens and arboreta. It was introduced to the United States in 1794, and has proved very popular in recent years as a replacement for American elms killed by Dutch elm disease. The tree was distributed in Victoria, Australia, from 1857. At the beginning of the 20th century, Searl's Garden Emporium, in Sydney, marketed it. In New Zealand, it was found to be particularly suitable for windswept locations along the coast. The tree is commonly planted as an ornamental in Japan, notably around Osaka Castle.

Ulmus parvifolia is one of the cold-hardiest of the Chinese species. In artificial freezing tests at the Morton Arboretum. the LT50 (temp. at which 50% of tissues die) was found to be .

Bonsai
Owing to its versatility and ability to tolerate a wide range of temperatures, light, and humidity conditions, the Chinese elm is a popular choice as a bonsai species. It is perhaps the single most widely available. It is considered a good choice for beginners because of its high tolerance of pruning.

Cultivars
Numerous cultivars have been raised, mostly in North America:

Hybrid cultivars
It is an autumn-flowering species, whereas most other elms flower in the spring. Hybrids include:
Frontier
Rebella

Accessions
North America
Arnold Arboretum, US. Acc. nos. 1353-73, 17917, 195-90, 197-90.
Bartlett Tree Experts, US. Acc. nos. 5546, 8109.
Brenton Arboretum, Dallas Center, Iowa, US. No details available.
Brooklyn Botanic Garden, New York, US. Acc. nos. 000880, 160001, 20020466, 850222, X00450, X00485, X02727, X02771.
Chicago Botanic Garden, US. 2 trees, no other details available.
Dominion Arboretum, Ottawa, Ontario, Canada. No acc. details.
Fullerton Arboretum, California State University, US. Acc. no. 80-036.
Holden Arboretum, US. Acc. nos. 57-1241, 80-665, 84-1214, 90-323.
Longwood Gardens, US. Acc. nos. 1957-1058, 1959-1500, 1960-1138, 1991-0981.
Missouri Botanical Garden, St. Louis, US. Acc. nos. 1986-0108, 1986-0276, 1986-0277, 1987-0019, 199-3195, 1996-3462.
Morris Arboretum, University of Pennsylvania, US. Acc. no. 32-0052-A.
Morton Arboretum, US. Acc. nos. 991-27, 772-54, 1231–57, 558-83, 52-96.
New York Botanical Garden, US. Acc. nos. 195/56, 486/91, 68072.
Phipps Conservatory, US. Acc. nos. 83-006, 83-058, 91-050, 2001-212UN.
Scott Arboretum, US. Acc. nos. 62210, 71765, 71767, 71771, 75152, 64441.
Smith College, US. Acc. no. 42894.
U S National Arboretum, Washington, D.C., US. Acc. nos. 58000/1/2/3/4/5/6/7/8.
Europe
Brighton & Hove City Council, UK. NCCPG Elm Collection.
Cambridge Botanic Garden, University of Cambridge, UK. No accession details available.
Dyffryn Gardens, Glamorgan. UK champion, 13 m high, 37 cm d.b.h., last surveyed 1997.
Grange Farm Arboretum, Sutton St. James, Spalding, Lincolnshire, UK. Acc. no. 516.
Great Fontley Butterfly Conservation Elm Trials plantation, UK. One seedling planted 2019.
Hortus Botanicus Nationalis, Salaspils, Latvia. Acc. nos. 18150, 18151.
Linnaean Gardens of Uppsala, Sweden. Acc. no. 2002-1542.
Royal Botanic Gardens Kew. Acc. nos. 1979-1613, 1979-1614, 1982–8479, 1982-8505, 1982-6280, 1982-6284, 2002-137, 2003-1267, 2005-1076.
Royal Botanic Gardens Kew Wakehurst Place, UK. Acc. nos. 1969-33664, 1969-35133, 1973-21049, 1973-21525.
Royal Horticultural Society Gardens, Wisley, UK. No details are available.
Wijdemeren City Council Elm arboretum: 4 cv. ‘UPMTF’ planted Molenmeent Loosdrecht in 2017.
Strona Arboretum, University of Life Sciences, Warsaw, Poland. No accession details are available.
Tallinn Botanic Garden, Estonia. No accession details available.
Thenford House arboretum, Banbury, UK. No details are available.
University of Copenhagen Botanic Garden. Denmark. Acc. nos. S1956-1338, S1997-1304.
Westonbirt Arboretum, Tetbury, Glos., UK. Planted 1981. No acc. no.
Australasia
Eastwoodhill Arboretum, Gisborne, New Zealand. 9 trees, details not known.

References

External links

  Ulmus parvifolia Jacq. (1909)
  Ulmus parvifolia Jacq. (1902, Späth nursery)
  Ulmus parvifolia Jacq. (1902, Späth)
  Ulmus parvifolia Jacq. (1902, Späth)

parvifolia
Plants used in bonsai
Trees of China
Flora of India (region)
Trees of Japan
Trees of Korea
Trees of Taiwan
Trees of Vietnam
Ulmus articles with images
Elm species and varieties
Taxa named by Nikolaus Joseph von Jacquin